Ham Hyeong Kyu is a South Korean footballer.

External links 
 Ham Hyeong Kyu dan Persela Lamongan Parade Gol di Surajaya 

1986 births
Living people
South Korean footballers
Expatriate footballers in Indonesia
Home United FC players
Expatriate footballers in Singapore
Singapore Premier League players
Association football forwards